is a Japanese romance original net animation series. It premiered on October 10, 2014 on Niconico, and a day later on NTV On Demand and Hulu. The series is originally based on a mobile game that is still in development.

Plot
The story follows Sayuri Haruno, a girl who attends an elite confectionery school Fleurir on a scholarship to follow her dream to open a pastry shop. There she meets several charming young men.

Characters

Main characters
 

She is the main character of the anime. She is a 16-year-old girl who has started studying in the Fleurir Academy. She is a lovely, talented, and friendly person that is given a scholarship to the Academy. Sannomiya calls her "Sayori" as if she were a fish. She is very innocent most of the time and always tries to do her best to help others. She has no parents so she lives in the academy along with Ran, a photo which she keeps in her room suggest that the couple holding the child are her parents and that her father was a pâtissier and wanted to follow in his footsteps.

 

He is Sayuri's classmate and partner for the first time they cooked. He can be quite serious and has a lot of talent because he comes from a family of bakers. He seems to have a crush on Sayuri because he gets jealous of the attention that the teachers pay to her. In episode 9, he tried to confess his feelings twice but was interrupted both times. And then again in episode 16, but again, interrupted.

 

He's one of the three professional teachers that the academy has. He is known as the "prince of chocolate" and has two brothers that work at their family restaurant. He seems to have a crush on Sayuri.

 

He's one of the three teachers. He is French. He's an extrovert, honest, dedicated, and has a happy personality. He always says that he loves Japan and is interested in learning a lot about the country and its culture since he was child because his grandmother was Japanese. He seems to have a crush on Sayuri and went on a "date" with her where they went sightseeing around Tokyo.

 

He is one of the three teachers. He's very interested in Japanese sweets and often tries creating new ones. He is quite inexpressive and difficult to talk to but talked to Sayuri with ease when they prepared some pastries for the head teacher. He has a fiancé;  however, it seems that he has not met her or that they do not get along well.

Supporting characters
 

He is one of Mitsuki's brothers that work in the family restaurant.

 

He's Mitsuki's other brother that works in the family restaurant.

 

She is Sayuri's best friend.

 

She is Sayuri's classmate and the only heir of the conglomerate, Sannomiya Group. She thinks of Sayuri as her rival and has a huge crush on Mitsuki.

 
She is the head teacher of Fleurir. She has kept an eye on Sayuri since the first day and constantly accuses her of illicit sexual relations with teachers whenever she sees her alone with a teacher. Naddeshiko is good friends with Gilbert's grandmother, because at a young age she got a scholarship to study in France to becoming a pâtissier and Gilbert's grandmother was a teacher there; it is also the reason how Gilbert came to work at Fleurir Academy.

 
 
A round marshmallow-like creature who introduces Fleurir Collections.

Episode list

References

External links
 
BONJOUR♪Sweet Love Patisserie at Crunchyroll

2014 anime ONAs
2014 video games
2014 web series debuts
Japanese animated web series
Anime based on video games
Cooking in anime and manga
Connect (studio)
CyberAgent
Male harem anime and manga
Romance anime and manga
Silver Link
Ameba (website)